Malaysia Hindu Dharma Mamandram, also known as Mamandram, is a Hindu-based non-governmental organisation in Malaysia. Malaysia Hindu Dharma Mamandram was founded in 1982 in Kuala Lumpur, Malaysia, and has about 35 active branches in various parts of the country. It is dedicated to serving Hindus in Malaysia through religious education and spiritual development by disseminating knowledge about moral values.

Malaysia Hindudharma Mamandram has been an integral part of negotiations with the government of Malaysia in addressing the misgivings of Indians in Malaysia, a problem that came to the fore with the HINDRAF-led rallies in the capital Kuala Lumpur on 25 November 2007.

See also
Survey of Hindu organisations

Notes

References

External links

Hindu organizations
Hindu organisations based in Malaysia
Hindu new religious movements